The University of Vaasa is a multidisciplinary, business-oriented university in Vaasa, Finland. The campus of the university is situated by the Gulf of Bothnia adjacent to downtown Vaasa. The university has evolved from a school of economics founded in 1968 to a university consisting of four different schools: The School of Accounting and Finance, The School of Management, The School of Marketing and Communications and the School of Technology and Innovations. University of Vaasa is one of the largest business universities in Finland. The university has personnel of around 500 which includes a teaching staff of 180 and 54 professors. Around 5000 students are currently studying in various degree programs at the university.

History 
In 1966 the Council of State made the decision to establish a School of Economics and Business Administration in Vaasa, and so Vaasa got its first institution of higher education which the region of Vaasa had worked for since the 1940s. The very next year the first students started their studies; 90 business and 60 correspondence students. The first principal to be chosen for the school was Tryggve Saxén and the first vice principal was Mauri Palomäki, who later would become the longest serving principal the school has seen so far. The lectures were first held in a yard building of Vaasa Commercial College in Raastuvankatu street, but in its second year the school moved into the whole house as the commercial college moved to a new building.

In 1977 the school became a state institution along with all other academic institutions in Finland.

In 1980 education in Humanities (languages) began and so the school became a "School of higher education" (in Finland the term is "Korkeakoulu"). In 1983 studies in the Social Sciences began and in 1990 Technology studies began in connection with Helsinki University of Technology. In 1991 it changed its name to University of Vaasa. In 1992 the school was organised into four faculties; The Humanities, Business Administration, Accounting and Industrial Management, and Social Sciences. In 1994 the university moved into its new premises on Palosaari. The university got the right to award master's degrees in Technology in 2004. In 2010 the university also reorganized its faculties to three, namely Faculty of Business Studies, Faculty of Technology and Faculty of Philosophy which includes previous faculties of Humanities and Social Sciences. In 2018 the university reorganized its structure again. Instead of three faculties, the University of Vaasa has four different schools: the School of Accounting and Finance, the School of Management, the School of Marketing and Communication studies and the School of Technology and Innovations.

Campus 
The university can be found in the neighbourhood of Palosaari beside the city's old cotton mill, which also houses part of the university. Each building has its own name, like the main building of "Tervahovi" and the governing building of "Luotsi". These buildings were finished in 1994 and planned in the spirit of the former county architect Carl Axel Setterberg who planned most of Vaasa's public buildings in 1860. The part of the university placed in the old mill is called "Fabriikki". There is also the academic library of Tritonia, which the university shares with the other academic institutions in the city, and the laboratory of Technobothnia, which is shared with the city's two universities of applied sciences. The whole campus is near the waterfront and surrounded by park areas. It is sometimes called the most beautiful campus in Finland.

Schools 
There are fours schools at the University of Vaasa:
 School of Management
 Human Resource Management
 Public Law
 Public Management
 Regional Studies
 Social and Health Management
 Strategic Management
 School of Accounting and Finance
 Accounting and Finance
 Business Law
 Economics
 School of Marketing and Communications 
 Communication studies
 International Business
 Marketing
 School of Technology and Innovations
 Mathematics and Statistics
 Electrical Engineering and Energy Technology
 Computer Science
 Production

Education and research 
The University of Vaasa is a business oriented and multi-disciplinary university. It offers education possibilities on the following levels:
 Bachelor's programmes
 Master's programmes
 Doctoral programmes
 Open University
 Continuing education
 Studies for exchange students
The strategic areas of research are management and change, energy and sustainable development and financing and economic decision making. University of Vaasa has fours schools and three research platforms: Vaasa Energy Business Innovation Centre (VEBIC), Digital Economy and Innovation and Entrepreneurship InnoLab.

Services 
 Levón Institute - Centre for Continuing Education
 Linginno - Language Centre
 Tritonia - Academic Library, Vaasa
 Technobotnia - Research Centre
 Vaasan Yliopiston Ylioppilaskunta - Student Union of Vaasa University
 University of Vaasa Executive Education -

Rectors 
 Tryggve Saxén 1968–1970
 Mauri Palomäki 1970–1987
 Ilkka Virtanen 1987–1994
 Ari Salminen 1994–1998
 Matti Jakobsson 1998–2014
 Suvi Ronkainen 2015–17
 Jari Kuusisto 2015–2017 (Acting rector)
 Jari Kuusisto 2017–2022
 Minna Martikainen 2023–

Honorary doctorates 
1988
 Heribert Picht
 Jaakko Numminen
 George Foster
 Bengt Holmström
 Jaakko Lassila
 Mauri Palomäki
 Martti Ulkuniemi

1998
 Brainard Guy Peters
 Vappu Taipale
 Joaquim Arnau
 Hartwig Kalverkämper
 Jean-François Hennart
 Matti Ilmari
 Baruch Lev
 Matti Sundberg

2006

 Esko Aho
 Christopher Pollitt
 Juhani Turunen
 Pirkko Nuolijärvi
 Sauli Takala
 John Vikström 
 Chris Brewster
 Eero Lehti
 Robert W. Scapens
 Pentti Malaska
 Dušan Malindžák
 Heikki Miilumäki

2011

 György Jenei
 Merrill Swain
 Paula Risikko
 Eva Liljeblom
 Klaus G.Grunert
 Jorma Ollila
 Jouko Havunen
 Paul Geladi
 Pertti Järvinen
 Mikko Niinivaara

2018

 Jan Engberg
 Leena Niemistö
 Pervez Ghauri
 Eric von Hippel
 Annamaria Lusardi
 Timo Ritakallio
 Clare Lavelle
 Vesa Laisi
 Sirinnapa (Mui) Saranwong

See also 
History of Finland
List of universities in Finland

References

External links 

Research Database of the University of Vaasa
Publications Database of the University of Vaasa
The Student Housing Foundation in Vaasa
Vaasa Consortium of Higher Education

Vaasa
Vaasa
Educational institutions established in 1968
Buildings and structures in Ostrobothnia (region)
1968 establishments in Finland